Mayals is the name of an electoral ward of the City and County of Swansea, Wales, UK. It is also part of the Mumbles Community.

The electoral ward consists of some or all of the following geographical areas: Blackpill, Mayals and part of West Cross, in the parliamentary constituency of Swansea West.  It is bounded by the wards of Sketty and Killay South to the north; Swansea Bay to the east; West Cross to the south; and Bishopston and Fairwood to the west.

2022 local council elections
At the 2022 Swansea Council elections on 5 May 2022, Swansea gained its first ever Green Party councillor, with Chris Evans winning the Mayals seat from the Conservatives by 125 votes.

2012 local council elections
In the local council elections for 2012, the turnout in the Mayals was 46.05%.  The results were:

References

Swansea electoral wards
Mumbles